The 1989 Stanford Cardinal football team represented Stanford University in the 1989 NCAA Division I-A football season. They were coached by first-year coach Dennis Green, previously an assistant coach with the San Francisco 49ers and hired to replace Jack Elway, who was fired the previous year.

Schedule

Roster

Season summary

at Arizona

at Oregon State

Oregon

San Jose State

Notre Dame

Steve Smith set the Pac-10 single game record for pass attempts.

at Washington State

Utah

at USC

UCLA

at Arizona State

California

References

Stanford
Stanford Cardinal football seasons
Stanford Cardinal football